is an action-adventure platform video game released by Konami in 1986, and a sequel to 1983's Antarctic Adventure. The game marks the professional debut of game designer Hideo Kojima, who was assistant designer on the project.

The story follows Penta, a penguin who has to bring home a golden apple in order to cure Penguette, the Penguin Princess.

Gameplay
This title significantly expanded upon the gameplay of Antarctic Adventure by most notably adding a greater variety of stages and enemies and RPG elements: boss fights, purchasable items, and several mini-games. Items can be purchased through three different fisherman, in exchange for fish, that give Penta new abilities. One of the items that can be bought is a gun.

Level design and variety have increased from Antarctic Adventure; there are forest levels, ice levels, water-based levels, caves, and even some outer-space bonus levels. There are several shortcuts, usually hidden underneath holes (which are typically harmful hazards) in the game, that allow the player to go on almost completely different paths. The game also featured multiple endings, with the hidden good ending available when the player pauses the game a certain number of times. In the bad ending, the princess dies, while in the good ending, she lives, an idea that Kojima would later use again in Metal Gear Solid and, to an extent, Metal Gear Solid 2: Sons of Liberty.

Ports 
 Zemina, a South Korean video game company, made an unauthorized Sega Master System port with the same title, credited as Kkum-Uidaelyug on the cartridge, which was published towards the end of the 1980s.
 The MSX version was re-released on several platforms during the years: first on PlayStation and Sega Saturn as part of Konami Antiques MSX Collection in 1997/1999, then on Virtual Console (first for Wii on November 24, 2009, later for Wii U on January 29, 2014) in Japan, and finally on PC on April 11, 2014 always in Japan (as Project EGG).
 A mobile version was released on May 31, 2006 only in Japan.

Other media 

In 2006, Konami Digital Entertainment Tokyo serialized a series of digital comics based on the video game of the same name titled .

References

External links 
 

1986 video games
D4 Enterprise games
Konami games
MSX games
Master System games
Mobile games
Fictional penguins
Virtual Console games
Virtual Console games for Wii U
Windows games
Unauthorized video games
Multiplayer and single-player video games
Video game sequels
Video games about birds
Video games with alternate endings
Video games developed in Japan